Escadrille 62 is a French Air Force squadron. It was founded on 11 August 1915 at Lyon–Bron Airport.

History
Escadrille 62 was originally equipped with Farman two-seater reconnaissance aircraft; thus, its first designation was Escadrille MF62. Its first assignment was to VI Armee of the French Army. On 5 May 1916, it was incorporated into a larger ad hoc unit, Groupe de Combat de la Somme—the other units included in the group were Escadrille N3, Escadrille N26, Escadrille N73, and Escadrille N103. On 25 May 1916, it rearmed with Nieuports, becoming Escadrille N62. Because the escadrille was a temporary augmentation to the groupe, it was detached and reassigned to the VI Armee as that unit's Escadrille d' Armee for the remainder of the war.

Escadrille 62 won five citations during its short participation in the First World War. The first, in January 1917, was for the destruction of 15 enemy aircraft and six observation balloons. On 16 November 1917, its second citation was for destroying 15 more aircraft; the escadrille was then entitled to wear a fourragère signifying its right to the Croix de Guerre. At about the same time, it also re-equipped with SPADs to become Escadrille Spa62. They used their new aircraft for deep photographic reconnaissance missions  behind enemy lines. On 25 January 1918, they took 180 photos; on 2 February they took 130 more. They were cited for this on 7 February 1918. On 18 July 1918, they were again cited for destruction of enemy aircraft—20 airplanes and an observation balloon. Their final citation came after war's end, on 18 December 1918, crediting them with 19 more victories; it entitled the escadrille's members to wear the fourragere of the Medaille Militare. Escadrille 62 was credited with a wartime record of 68 destroyed enemy airplanes and seven downed observation balloons.

Escadrille SPA.62 continues to serve in the current French Air Force.

Commanding officers

 Lieutenant Horment
 Capitaine François Coli
 Capitaine Blaumautier

Notable personnel
 Marcel Bloch
 Charles Borzecki
 André Louis Bosson
 François Coli
 Jean-Paul Favre de Thierrens
 Charles Quette
 Paul Tarascon

Aircraft
 Maurice Farman
 Nieuport
 SPAD

References

Further reading 
 Bailey, Frank W., and Christophe Cony. French Air Service War Chronology, 1914-1918: Day-to-Day Claims and Losses by French Fighter, Bomber and Two-Seat Pilots on the Western Front. London: Grub Street, 2001.
 Davilla, James J., and Arthur M. Soltan. French Aircraft of the First World War. Stratford, CT: Flying Machines Press, 1997.
 Les escadrilles de l'aéronautique militaire française: symbolique et histoire, 1912-1920. Vincennes: Service historique de l'armée de l'air, 2004.

External links
Escadrille MF 62 - N 62 - SPA 62

French Air and Space Force squadrons